Chirundu is a constituency of the National Assembly of Zambia, created in 2016. It covers the towns of Chirundu and Lusitu in Chirundu District of Southern Province.

List of MPs

References

Constituencies of the National Assembly of Zambia
2016 establishments in Zambia
Constituencies established in 2016